Déborah Almeida de Souza (born October 19, 1982 in Rio de Janeiro) is a judoka from Brazil.

Biography
Souza was born in Rio de Janeiro and begun with judo when she was 12 in Judô Clube Joaquim Mamede. Later she moved in bigger club Gama Filho.

Judo
She won bronze medal at 2009 Pan American Judo Championships in half-heavyweight category.

Achievements

References

External links 
 
 Judo Rio

1982 births
Living people
Brazilian female judoka
Sportspeople from Rio de Janeiro (city)